Kiwigaster is a genus of braconid wasps in the family Braconidae. There is at least one described species in Kiwigaster, K. variabilis, found in New Zealand.

References

Microgastrinae